Altar of Heaven may refer to:

Ara Coeli, legendary ancient altar on the Capitoline Hill in Rome
Temple of Heaven, Ming temple complex in Beijing